Jason Sutter is an American musician and drummer based in Los Angeles, California. He is currently the drummer for Cher.

A well versed drummer, having studied and performed extensively across multiple genres, Sutter is most widely recognized within the rock genre for his associations with bands such as Marilyn Manson, Smash Mouth, New York Dolls, Chris Cornell (Soundgarden, Audioslave), and Foreigner among others.

Early life
Originally from Potsdam, New York, Sutter’s interest in playing drums began early as a young child and was supported by his parents thus leading to initial lessons with Jim Petercsak, a musician and instructor having also taught Dave Weckl and Vinnie Colaiuta.

Sutter performed professionally for the first time at age ten and by age thirteen had formed a band with three friends known as Paragon. Performing frequently at local clubs, venues, and events throughout his early teens and high school, Sutter would play up to three gigs per week while also furthering his interest in music scholastically.

After high school graduation Sutter attended the University of North Texas, receiving a bachelor’s degree in music education. In later years he would attend the University of Miami to broaden his scope of learning which included marimba, orchestral, drum corps, and other disciplines, thereby earning a master’s degree in orchestral percussion in 1995. During graduate school in Miami Sutter taught, performed, and recorded with top ensembles including the university’s highly regarded concert jazz band and other professional shows which soon led to his first tour with recording artist Juliana Hatfield.

Career
Over the next several years Sutter would gain more recognition, recording and playing with a range of artists, bands, and musical acts including Letters to Cleo, Jack Drag, Ben Lee, The Rembrandts, Vertical Horizon, Jason Faulkner, Babyface, Pink, The Campfire Girls, Chantal Kreviazuk, Joe Walsh, Butch Walker, Our Lady Peace, Dean and Robert DeLeo of Stone Temple Pilots, Nina Gordon of Veruca Salt, and American Hi-Fi in addition to (the aforementioned) Marilyn Manson, Smash Mouth, New York Dolls, Chris Cornell, Joe Perry and Foreigner.

From 2006 to 2009 Sutter toured and recorded with Chris Cornell. In 2010 Sutter recorded and toured with the bands Vertical Horizon and Foreigner then, later that same year, joined the New York Dolls for two international tours which would continue the following two years. In 2012, soon after returning from the New York Dolls worldwide tour, Sutter joined Marilyn Manson touring globally again the subsequent two years.

In addition to recording and touring Sutter’s performances include feature film and television appearances such as The Tonight Show with Jay Leno, Late Night with Conan O'Brien, The Carson Daly Show, and The Late Show with David Letterman.

It was announced in 2014 that Sutter, having previously toured and recorded with Smash Mouth circa 2005 to 2006, had returned, coming on board as drummer for the band's 20th anniversary worldwide tour titled Under The Sun.

In 2016 Sutter began touring Japan with Tak Matsumoto and also conducted drum clinics and lectures at universities across the US, followed in 2017 by a series of drum clinics across Europe.    The same year he embarked on an extensive summer festival tour with Twisted Sister's Dee Snider.   

Since 2017 Sutter has been performing with the legendary Cher at her Las Vegas residency and across the world on her sold-out arena tours. 

Sutter also conducts drum clinics and lectures at various conventions, industry events, and universities throughout the U. S. In 2014, together with Regal Tip, Sutter produced a signature line of drum sticks and brushes which include "Chop Sticks" and "The Sutter", respectively.

References

Living people
People from Potsdam, New York
Musicians from Los Angeles
Musicians from New York (state)
University of North Texas College of Music alumni
University of Miami Frost School of Music alumni
1969 births
20th-century American drummers
American male drummers
American Hi-Fi members
Letters to Cleo members
20th-century American male musicians